Complete-linkage clustering is one of several methods of agglomerative hierarchical clustering. At the beginning of the process, each element is in a cluster of its own. The clusters are then sequentially combined into larger clusters until all elements end up being in the same cluster. The method is also known as farthest neighbour clustering. The result of the clustering can be visualized as a dendrogram, which shows the sequence of cluster fusion and the distance at which each fusion took place.

Clustering procedure 

At each step, the two clusters separated by the shortest distance are combined. The definition of 'shortest distance' is what differentiates between the different agglomerative clustering methods. In complete-linkage clustering, the link between two clusters contains all element pairs, and the distance between clusters equals the distance between those two elements (one in each cluster) that are farthest away from each other. The shortest of these links that remains at any step causes the fusion of the two clusters whose elements are involved. 

Mathematically, the complete linkage function — the distance  between clusters  and  — is described by the following expression :

where

Algorithms

Naive scheme 
The following algorithm is an agglomerative scheme that erases rows and columns in a proximity matrix as old clusters are merged into new ones. The  proximity matrix D contains all distances d(i,j). The clusterings are assigned sequence numbers 0,1,......, (n − 1) and L(k) is the level of the kth clustering. A cluster with sequence number m is denoted (m) and the proximity between clusters (r) and (s) is denoted d[(r),(s)].

The complete linkage clustering algorithm consists of the following steps:

 Begin with the disjoint clustering having level   and sequence number .
 Find the most similar pair of clusters in the current clustering, say pair , according to where the minimum is over all pairs of clusters in the current clustering.
 Increment the sequence number: . Merge clusters  and  into a single cluster to form the next clustering . Set the level of this clustering to 
 If all objects are in one cluster, stop. Else, go to step 2.

Optimally efficient scheme 
The algorithm explained above is easy to understand but of complexity . In May 1976, D. Defays proposed an optimally efficient algorithm of only complexity  known as CLINK (published 1977) inspired by the similar algorithm SLINK for single-linkage clustering.

Working example 
The working example is based on a JC69 genetic distance matrix computed from the 5S ribosomal RNA sequence alignment of five bacteria: Bacillus subtilis, Bacillus stearothermophilus, Lactobacillus viridescens, Acholeplasma modicum, and Micrococcus luteus.

First step 

 First clustering
Let us assume that we have five elements  and the following matrix  of pairwise distances between them:

 First branch length estimation
This corresponds to the expectation of the ultrametricity hypothesis.

 First distance matrix update
Bold values in  correspond to the new distances, calculated by retaining the maximum distance between each element of the first cluster  and each of the remaining elements:

Second step 

 Second clustering
We now reiterate the three previous steps, starting from the new distance matrix  :

 Second branch length estimation

We deduce the missing branch length:
 (see the final dendrogram)

 Second distance matrix update

Third step 

 Third clustering
We again reiterate the three previous steps, starting from the updated distance matrix .

 Third branch length estimation

 Third distance matrix update
There is a single entry to update:

Final step

The final  matrix is:

We deduce the two remaining branch lengths:

The complete-linkage dendrogram

The dendrogram is now complete. It is ultrametric because all tips ( to ) are equidistant from  :

Comparison with other linkages 

Alternative linkage schemes include single linkage clustering and average linkage clustering - implementing a different linkage in the naive algorithm is simply a matter of using a different formula to calculate inter-cluster distances in the initial computation of the proximity matrix and in step 4 of the above algorithm. An optimally efficient algorithm is however not available for arbitrary linkages. The formula that should be adjusted has been highlighted using bold text.

Complete linkage clustering avoids a drawback of the alternative single linkage method - the so-called chaining phenomenon, where clusters formed via single linkage clustering may be forced together due to single elements being close to each other, even though many of the elements in each cluster may be very distant to each other. Complete linkage tends to find compact clusters of approximately equal diameters.

See also 
 Cluster analysis
 Hierarchical clustering
 Molecular clock
 Neighbor-joining
 Single-linkage clustering
 UPGMA
 WPGMA

References

Further reading 
 

Cluster analysis algorithms
Bioinformatics algorithms
Computational phylogenetics